This is a list of ambassadors of the United States to Cyprus.

Until 1960 Cyprus had been a colony of the British Empire. On August 16, 1960, Cyprus gained its independence from the United Kingdom. The United States recognized the new nation and established an embassy in Nicosia on August 16, 1960, with L. Douglas Heck as Chargé d'Affaires ad interim. Diplomatic relations between the United States and Cyprus have been continuous since that time.

One ambassador, Rodger P. Davies, was assassinated by a sniper while at his post in 1974.

The United States does not recognize the Turkish Republic of Northern Cyprus, proclaimed November 15, 1983, by Turkey.

The U.S. Embassy in Cyprus is located in Nicosia.

Ambassadors

Notes

See also
Cyprus – United States relations
Foreign relations of Cyprus
Ambassadors of the United States

References
United States Department of State: Background notes on Cyprus

External links
 United States Department of State: Cyprus
 United States Embassy in Nicosia

Cyprus

United States